The Nathan Eckstein Middle School (originally Nathan Eckstein Junior High School) is an American middle school located in Seattle, Washington, and is part of Seattle Public Schools.

History
Eckstein Middle School is part of the Seattle Public School District and located on the border of the Wedgwood and Ravenna  neighborhoods.  It was named after Nathan Eckstein, a Seattle businessman, Seattle School Board member, and onetime director of Seattle Public Schools.

The school originally opened as a junior high school in 1950 to 790 students. In 1971, it was changed into a middle school, teaching students in grades six through eight. For many years leading up to 2014, when school boundaries changed, Eckstein's student enrollment was about 1300 students. It now serves about 950 students, over 90 of whom are enrolled in the special education program, and employs 44 certificated teachers.

Eckstein is known for its academic program, elective offerings, and award-winning music and technology education programs.

In 1998, Richard Riley, the U.S. Secretary of Education, chose to deliver the State of Education address in the school's auditorium.

The building is a designated city landmark.

An urban legend exists among the school that a pool exists on the roof, inspired by a sign in the school where "Roof" is partially scratched off to read "Pool".

Music Program

Orchestra 
Eckstein has three orchestras. They are the Junior, Intermediate, and Senior Orchestras, as well as a chamber group. now taught by Angelina Kong after the retirement of Brad Smith.
The Senior Orchestra goes on an annual retreat to Icicle Creek Music Center for four days at the beginning of February, as of 2019. The Eckstein orchestra program has won a notable number of awards.

Band Program
Eckstein has five Bands, not including the Jazz Bands. They are all taught by Cuauhtemoc Escobedo, except for the Beginning Band, which is taught by Angelina Kong. Beginning Band is for students beginning in the 6th grade instead of Elementary. Junior Band is for 6th graders, who played band in Elementary school and are at an average skill level for their age. Intermediate Band consists of mostly 7th graders, and usually about 0 to 8 6th graders who are above average skill level. Wind Ensemble is mainly for 8th graders, but less commonly obtains 7th graders and more recently, 6th graders.

Jazz Band
Eckstein has three jazz bands, two of which meet as a class during the school day, and one of which meets on Tuesdays and Thursdays after school. All three Jazz bands are taught by Moc Escobedo. The Senior Jazz Band attends the Monterey Jazz Festival in Monterey, California, and the Reno Jazz Festival  in Nevada.

Eckstein Logo  
In March 2013, an Eckstein student named Jeremy Zhang entered and won the Eckstein Logo Contest. The Logo consists of the Letter 'E', representing the Eckstein community, and various Eagle heads symbolizing the students of the school. The wings represents the teachers and staff who help and support the students.

Notable alumni
Aaron Brooks, NBA player
Ann Dunham, Barack Obama's mother.
 Duff McKagan, bass guitarist of Guns N' Roses

References

 Eckstein Middle School website
 HistoryLink: Nathan Eckstein
 
 Seattle Public School Details

Additional Links
Seattle Public Schools website

Public middle schools in Washington (state)
Seattle Public Schools
Middle schools in Seattle